Konstantinos Dimitriou (born 30 June 1999) is a Greek professional footballer who plays as a centre-back for Super League 2 club Panserraikos.

Career

Early career
Dimitriou began playing football at the age of 4 in the youth academy of Giannitsa, and moved to PAOK in 2013.

Basel
On 11 May 2018, Swiss club Basel announced that they had signed Dimitriou from the youth department of PAOK. At the beginning of his stay with the club Dimitriu played at trainer with Basel's U21 team, where he had 18 appearances. To the start of their 2019–20 season under head coach Marcel Koller Dimitriu advanced to Basel's first team. After playing in four test games he played his domestic league debut for the club in the away game in the Stockhorn Arena on 3 August 2019 as Basel won 3–2 against Thun. Two weeks later he played in the Swiss Cup away match against amateur club Pully Football. This was his last appearance in the first team, because after visiting his family in Greece he was tested corona positive. Following his recovery he returned to the U21 team.

Loan to Wil
During the winter break of the 2019–20 season, on 9 January 2020, Dimitriou was loaned to Wil until the end of the season.

Return to Basel
Following his loan period Dimitriou returned to Basel, but only appeared in one test match. On 28 January 2020 it was announced that he transferred to Mezőkövesd. Between the years 2018 and 2021 Dimitriou played a total of 12 games for Basel's first team without scoring a goal. One of these games were in the Swiss Super League, one in the Swiss Cup and 10 were friendly games.

Mezőkövesd
Dimitriou moved to Hungary and stayed with Mezőkövesd until the end of the season.

Honours
Basel
 Swiss Cup: 2018–19

References

External links

 
 PAOK Profile
 SFL Profile

1999 births
Living people
Footballers from Thessaloniki
Greek footballers
Greece youth international footballers
Swiss Super League players
Nemzeti Bajnokság I players
Super League Greece 2 players
FC Basel players
Mezőkövesdi SE footballers
Panserraikos F.C. players
Association football defenders
Greek expatriate footballers
Expatriate footballers in Switzerland
Expatriate footballers in Hungary
Greek expatriate sportspeople in Hungary